Mount Baldy or Mount Baldy Village, formerly Camp Baynham and Camp Baldy, is an unincorporated community in the San Gabriel Mountains, in San Bernardino County near the eastern border of Los Angeles County, in Southern California. It is located below Mount San Antonio, commonly known as "Mount Baldy", hence its name.

Geography
It is located below Mount San Antonio (Mt Baldy) in San Antonio Canyon. San Antonio Creek flows through the community. It is surrounded by Angeles National Forest.

History

Around the turn of the twentieth century, when the Baldy Bowl was transitioning from resource extraction and toward recreation, a series of bitter conflicts took place there between the San Antonio Water Company and various camp owners. Pollution of the watershed and an 1899 brush fire led the company to wrest legal control of the road through the canyon away from Charles Baynham, close off the canyon with locked gates, and station armed guards to keep out intruders. But after some time and various legal battles, the company decided to profit from recreation rather than discouraging it. It bought Baynham's Camp in 1907 but then hired Baynham to manage it, charging tolls on the road from 1908 to 1922. The camp was renamed Camp Baldy in 1910, and in the following year the canyon became accessible by automobile. By the early 1920s there were numerous trail camps and resorts in the area. When the area became a national forest in 1908, the forest service began offering 99-year leases of plots of land, including at Camp Baldy.

The Los Angeles flood of 1938 destroyed most of the human-made structures in Camp Baldy. The casino was destroyed, but the hotel (today's Buckhorn Lodge) survived. Camp Baldy was rebuilt and later became Mt. Baldy Village.

Buildings
Mt Baldy has a post office with ZIP code 91759. The community was established as Camp Baynham in 1906; it changed its name to Camp Baldy in 1910 and became Mt Baldy in 1951. Its post office was established in 1913.

The Mt Baldy School District operates the Mt Baldy School in town. The Mt Baldy Zen Center is located in the area.

The Mt Baldy Ski Lifts are above the town on the slopes of Mt Baldy.

Utilities and services

The town of Mount Baldy is served by privately-owned utilities. Public services are by county and state governments.

Mt. Baldy is located in California's 8th congressional district, represented by Republican Jay Obernolte.

Electricity

Southern California Edison

Cable TV and internet

Charter Communications (Charter Spectrum)
Frontier Communications

Natural gas

Gas is propane, as no natural gas lines are available.

Law enforcement

San Bernardino County Sheriff
Los Angeles County Sheriff

Fire

San Bernardino County Fire Department
Los Angeles County Fire Department

Schools

Mount Baldy School District

Municipal governments

Los Angeles County, California
San Bernardino County, California

Roads

Caltrans

Climate
Mt Baldy has relatively cold and very wet winters with moderate snowfall. It is usually  during the day during the winter, and 25–35 °F at night. Summer temperatures are mild to warm, and can get chilly at night. Thunderstorms are not common, on occasion they brew in the mountains in and surrounding Mt Baldy. They usually occur in the afternoon, and clear up by late evening.

See also
 Winfred J. Sanborn, pioneer
 
 San Gabriel Mountains National Monument

References

External links
 Mt Baldy Fire Department

Unincorporated communities in San Bernardino County, California
San Gabriel Mountains
Unincorporated communities in California